June Juanico (born 19 November 1938) is an Elvis Presley fan from Biloxi, Mississippi, whom the famous rock 'n' roll singer dated in 1955 and 1956, for instance, when he took three weeks of vacation after having recorded his songs "Hound Dog" and "Don't Be Cruel" in the studio in New York City.

Elvis Presley

June Juanico had met Presley for the first time after one of his early concerts in Biloxi in 1955, when he was on the verge of superstardom. Elvis did not let this romance get too intimate. In a 1997 interview with the San Francisco Chronicle, she swears that she never had sex with Presley. "I was tempted to, oh, yeah. But I was a virgin and the times were different back then." In the same interview, she also blames his manager, Colonel Tom Parker, for encouraging Presley to go out with beautiful women for the publicity.

According to Elvis biographer Peter Guralnick, Juanico did not doubt that Elvis loved her, but "she didn't know if she could ever get him back," because on one of their dates the singer was always talking about his best friend, actor Nick Adams. "He started telling her all about Nick and Nick's friends and Jimmy Dean, but she didn't want to hear." What really upset Juanico, though, was that Adams had started inviting himself to see Elvis, and Juanico felt that she was trying to compete for Elvis' attention. Adams would talk often about Natalie Wood to Elvis, constantly discussing her figure and her beauty, something else that caused Juanico to feel that she would soon lose Elvis to the glitz of Hollywood. Juanico's fears were not just a paranoia, as Elvis did have a short fling with Wood during his early days in Hollywood.

Juanico was surprised when she heard about her former boyfriend's prescription drug abuse. "He never drank or did drugs when I was around him," she says. She thinks she might have prevented Elvis from becoming dependent on drugs when they had stayed together. "When Elvis died, I felt guilty. I've never been able to understand how he could be surrounded with so many people who supposedly loved him and yet they allowed him to do that to himself."

She wrote a book on Presley entitled Elvis: In the Twilight of Memory (1997). According to the New York Times review, the book reads "like a high-school diary, clichés abound, intimate descriptions of sexual fumblings tell us more than we really want to know, and dialogue between the lovers sounds like a movie script in dire need of rewrite. ... However, her description of a 'special afternoon with just the two of us at the piano' with Presley singing 'Unchained Melody, just for you, baby' is touching."

References

External links
 June Juanico Remembers Elvis Presley By Alanna Nash
 Girls! Girls! Girls! From small-town women to movie stars, Elvis loved often but never true
 The Girls Guide to Elvis Presley

1938 births
Living people
Elvis Presley